Metal plating